The Bibliotheca Hagiographica Orientalis is a catalogue of Arabic, Coptic, Syriac, Armenian, and Ethiopian hagiographic materials, including ancient literary works on the saints' lives, the translations of their relics, and their miracles, arranged alphabetically by saint.  It is usually abbreviated as BHO in scholarly literature.  The listings include MSS, incipits, and printed editions.  The BHO along with the Bibliotheca Hagiographica Graeca and Bibliotheca Hagiographica Latina are the most useful tools in the research of literary documents concerning the saints.

Editions
 Bibliotheca hagiographica orientalis, ed. Paul Peeters, Subsidia Hagiographica 10 (Bruxelles: Société des Bollandistes, 1910 [reprinted 1954, 1970]).

See also 
Bibliotheca Hagiographica Graeca
Bibliotheca Hagiographica Latina

References

External links
 Société des Bollandistes
 Bibliotheca Hagiographica Orientalis

Christian hagiography
Catalogues
Jesuit publications
Belgian books
20th-century Arabic books
Arabic non-fiction books
Armenian-language books
20th-century non-fiction books
20th-century history books